The 2014 Club Atlético Boca Juniors season was the 85th consecutive Primera División season played by the senior squad. That Boca Juniors took part in Argentine Primera División, Copa Argentina and Copa Sudamericana.

Season overview

June
6 June:  Boca announced that Jonathan Calleri signs for Boca from All Boys for $300.0000.
19 June:  Lucas Viatri signs for Shanghai Greenland from Boca for €2.200.000.
20 June:  Boca announced that Emanuel Trípodi renewed a one-year loan.
24 June:  Juan Sánchez Miño signs for Torino from Boca for €3.200.000.

July
1 July:  Lisandro Magallán, Guillermo Burdisso, Sebastián Palacios and Sergio Araujo returned from  Rosario Central, Galatasaray, Unión and Tigre after a loan spell.

 Diego Perotti and Claudio Riaño expired their loans and signed with Genoa and Independiente respectively.

2 July:  César Meli signs for Boca from Colón on a 6-month loan, with an option to make the move permanent for $500.0000.

 Alan Aguirre and Sebastián Vidal signed for Douglas Haig and Temperley, on a 6-month and 18-month loan respectively.

3 July:  Gonzalo Castellani signs for Boca from Godoy Cruz for $1.600.000.

 Alan Pérez signed for Deportes Magallanes on a one-year loan.

4 July:  Guillermo Fernández and Franco Fragapane signed for Atlético de Rafaela and Elche Ilicitano on an 18-month and one-year loan respectively.
8 July:  Cristian Pavón signs for Boca from Talleres (C) for $1.600.000 and signs a one-year loan for Colón.
10 July:  Federico Carrizo signs for Boca from Rosario Central for $2.700.000.
16 July: Boca played the first friendly match against Boca Unidos, the match ended in a 2-0 defeat for the team of Carlos Bianchi.
17 July:  Juan Roman Riquelme signs for Argentinos Juniors from Boca after expiring the contract on 30 June.

  David Achucarro and Orlando Gaona Lugo signed for Olimpo on an 18-month loan .

19 July:  Sergio Araujo signs for Las Palmas on a one-year loan.
20 July: Boca played the second friendly match against Nacional in Montevideo. The match ended 0–1 with the only goal coming from Jonathan Calleri in the 92nd minute that gave Boca the "Atilio Garcia Cup".
22 July:  Andrés Chávez signs for Boca from Banfield for $2.500.000.
24 July:  Diego Rivero signs for Argentinos Juniors from Boca after expiring the contract on 30 June.
26 July:  Sebastián Palacios signs for Arsenal on a 6-month loan.

Boca played against Huracán on the Round of 32 of 2013–14 Copa Argentina and it was defeated 0-2. Emanuel Insúa was injured in the first half.

28 July: The new uniforms were presented.
30 July:  José Pedro Fuenzalida signs for Boca from Colo-Colo for $400.000.

Due to the death of Julio Humberto Grondona the Round 1 of Torneo Transición was postponed 1 week.

31 July:  Mauro Dalla Costa signs for San Martín (SJ) on a 6-month loan.

August
7 August:  Mariano Echeverria signs for Boca from Arsenal on a one-year loan.
8 August:  Alex Jara signs for Boca and signs a one-year loan for Sportivo Italiano.
10 August: On the Round 1 of Torneo Transición Boca started the tournament with a defeat against Newell's Old Boys. The only goal was scored by Mauricio Tévez.
15 August: Guillermo Burdisso suffered the rupturing of the meniscus. Burdisso would be out for several weeks.
18 August: On the Round 2 of Torneo Transición Boca defeated Belgrano, Emanuel Gigliotti scored the goal in the last seconds of the game with a great assist of Federico Carrizo. Fernando Gago was injured in the first half and was replaced by Gonzalo Castellani.
19 August: Fernando Gago and Juan Manuel Martínez suffered the distension of a muscle. They are not going to play against Atletico de Rafaela.
22 August: Another injured; Juan Forlín suffered the strain of the left Biceps femoris muscle. He also will not play against Atletico de Rafaela.
24 August: On the Round 3 of Torneo Transición Boca suffered another defeat in La Bombonera, against Atletico de Rafaela, who had never won in the stadium of Boca. The result was 0-3, and a great concern for Carlos Bianchi.
27 August: On the Round 4 of Torneo Transición, Boca worsened their crisis; it was defeated 3-1 by Estudiantes (LP), showing a very poor level.
27 August:  Due to poor results, Carlos Bianchi was sacked after a year and a half in the club, in this time, he earned 26 wins, 22 ties and 26 defeats. 
27 August:  Rodolfo Arruabarrena was announced as the new manager.
31 August: On the Round 5 of Torneo Transición, after two consecutive defeats, Boca returned to the victory; defeated Vélez Sarsfield 3-1 on the first match of the new manager Rodolfo Arruabarrena.

September
4 September: On the first leg of the second stage of 2014 Copa Sudamericana, Boca played against Rosario Central, Boca was winning 1-0 but in the last seconds, Central was able to score and the match finished 1-1. Boca continued showing a great improvement. 
5 September: Pablo Ledesma entered in the last minutes of the match against Rosario Central, but was injured, he suffered a luxation in his shoulder, he will be out 2 months.
7 September: On the Round 6 of Torneo Transición, Boca played with Olimpo in the stadium Roberto Carminatti, Olimpo played with 10 players almost the entire match, after searching the 1-0, Emanuel Gigliotti scored and Boca won their second straight game.
14 September: On the Round 7 of Torneo Transición, Boca played in La Bombonera against Racing. Jonathan Calleri scored the first goal but due to adverse weather conditions, it was rescheduled to September 25.
18 September: On the second leg of the second stage of 2014 Copa Sudamericana, Boca got a 3-0 victory over Rosario Central with Andrés Chávez scoring twice and José Pedro Fuenzalida scoring the third goal. Boca showed a very good football, and advanced to the next stage.
21 September: On the Round 8 of Torneo Transición, Boca played vs Banfield. Again, Andrés Chávez scored the first goal, but in the last moments onf the game, Banfield scored and the match finished 1-1. Daniel Díaz was replaced in the half-time with a sprained left knee, he will be injured one month and he could not play the Superclásico.
22 September: After the problem of Daniel Díaz, is added a ney injury: Juan Forlín, again suffered another strain, on the right Gastrocnemius muscle, he will also could not play the Superclásico.
25 September: On the Round 7 of Torneo Transición, in the rescheduled match from September 14, Boca had problems in defense and Racing won 2-1 with Gustavo Bou scoring twice.
28 September: On the Round 9 of Torneo Transición, Boca played vs Quilmes and won 1-0, the only goal was scored by Federico Carrizo. Thus, Boca arrives to the Superclásico with confidence.

October
5 October: On the Round 10 of Torneo Transición, Boca played against River Plate, the Superclásico, the most important match of Argentina. It was a 1-1 draw, with Lisandro Magallán scoring for Boca and Germán Pezzella scoring for River.
12 October: On the Round 11 of Torneo Transición, Boca played against Rosario Central. It was a victory 2-1, despite not having a very good performance.
15 October: On the first leg of the Round of 16 of 2014 Copa Sudamericana Boca suffered against Deportivo Capiatá, a small team from Paraguay, it was 0-1.
19 October: On the Round 12 of Torneo Transición, Boca played against Godoy Cruz. It was a victory 3-2, showing defensive mistakes, with Fernando Gago playing a great match.
23 October: On the second leg of the Round of 16 of 2014 Copa Sudamericana, Boca won 1-0 in Luque against Deportivo Capiatá and forced the penalty shoot-out and won 4-3. Now Boca will play against another Paraguayan team: Cerro Porteño.
26 October: On the Round 13 of Torneo Transición, Boca played against Defensa y Justicia. It was a victory 2-0 with Juan Manuel Martínez scoring the two goals. Lisandro Magallán was injured in his left knee.
27 October: Finally, Lisandro Magallán suffered the anterior cruciate ligament of his left knee, and he will be out of activity for six months.
30 October: On the first leg of the Quarterfinals of 2014 Copa Sudamericana, Boca won 1-0 against Cerro Porteño in a tight match, with Emanuel Gigliotti scoring the only goal.

November
2 November: On the Round 14 of Torneo Transición, Boca played against San Lorenzo, again, under the rain, it was a 0-2 defeat. Boca couldn't play a good match.
6 November: On the second leg of the Quarterfinals of 2014 Copa Sudamericana, Boca won 4-1 against Cerro Porteño in a Paraguay, it was the best match of the team since the arrive of Rodolfo Arruabarrena. Now in Semifinals, Boca will play against River Plate another edition of the Superclásico, the last one in continental tournaments was 10 years ago in the Semifinals of the 2004 Copa Libertadores, with Boca winning the playoff by penalty shoot-out.
9 November: On the Round 15 of Torneo Transición, Boca played against Tigre, Boca playing with an alternative team won 2-0 with Emanuel Gigliotti scoring twice.
16 November: On the Round 16 of Torneo Transición, Boca played against Arsenal, again, with an alternative team and the game ended 1-1.
20 November: On the first leg of the Semifinals of 2014 Copa Sudamericana, Boca faced River Plate, it was 0-0 in a hard match and disputed match. River finished the game with 7 yellow cards. Juan Manuel Martínez played only 30 minutes because of a foul committed by Leonel Vangioni and it was replaced by José Pedro Fuenzalida.
21 November: Juan Manuel Martínez injury was confirmed: a sprain on his right ankle, He will not play in the rest of the season.
23 November: On the Round 17 of Torneo Transición, Boca played in La Bombonera against Independiente. It was a victory 3-1 with two goals of Jonathan Calleri and one of Emanuel Gigliotti. Federico Carrizo played a great match with two assists.
27 November: On the second leg of the Semifinals of 2014 Copa Sudamericana, Boca lost to River Plate 1-0 and was eliminated from the tournament.
30 November: On the Round 18 of Torneo Transición, Boca played against Lanús. It was a 2-2 draw, Boca played with an alternative team.

December
8 December: On the Round 19 of Torneo Transición, Boca played against Gimnasia y Esgrima (LP), in the last match of the season, it was a 0-2 defeat.

Current squad

Last updated on 8 December 2014

Transfers

In:

Out:

Out on loan

Top scorers
Last updated on 8 December 2014.

Top assists
Last updated on 8 December 2014.

Penalties

Clean sheets
Last updated on 8 December 2014.

Disciplinary record
Last updated on 8 December 2014.

References

External links
 Club Atlético Boca Juniors official web site 

Boc
Club Atlético Boca Juniors seasons